Sadou Hayatou (15 February 1942 – 1 August 2019) was a Cameroonian politician. Hayatou served as the 4th Prime Minister of Cameroon from 26 April 1991 to 9 April 1992.

Biography
Hayatou was born in Garoua. 
His brother, Issa Hayatou, was for a long time, the President of the Confederation of African Football (CAF).

He was appointed to the government of Cameroon as Minister of Agriculture in 1984. He was the Minister of Finance of Cameroon from 1987 to 1990.

After his stint as Prime Minister, Hayatou became National Director of the Bank of Central African States (BEAC), leaving that post on January 1, 2008. Despite the official retirement age at the Bank being 60, Hayatou was kept in his post for five additional years by BEAC Governor Jean-Félix Mamalepot.

References

1942 births
2019 deaths
People from Garoua
Prime Ministers of Cameroon
Finance ministers of Cameroon
Cameroonian Muslims